Inez Barron (née Smith) (born February 16, 1946) is an American educator and politician who served in the New York City Council for the 42nd district from 2014 to 2021. She is a Democrat. The district includes Broad Channel, Brownsville, Canarsie, East Flatbush, East New York, Howard Beach and Jamaica Bay in Brooklyn. Formerly, she served as the state Assemblywoman for New York's 60th district.

Life and career
Born in Fort Greene, Brooklyn, Barron has been a community activist and a longtime educator since the 1960s. She is a graduate of Hunter College of the City University of New York with a Bachelor of Science in Physiology and Bank Street College of Education with a Master of Science in Reading and Special Education. Barron was a teacher for more than 36 years with New York Public Schools.

After assemblywoman Diane Gordon was charged with several scandals and eventually vacated the seat, Barron won the November 2008 election and became the State assemblywoman for the 40th district.

Like her husband, Charles Barron, she is known for her polarizing views and colorful remarks.

New York City Council
Due to term limits, Charles Barron could not run for re-election to the New York City Council in 2013; Inez Barron ran instead and won. He did, however, run for her vacant Assembly seat, which he later won.

Barron resigned her seat in the Assembly to join the Council on January 1, 2014.

References

External links
The New York City Council: Councilwoman Inez Barron (official site)

Democratic Party members of the New York State Assembly
Women state legislators in New York (state)
African-American state legislators in New York (state)
African-American women in politics
Living people
New York City Council members
People from Fort Greene, Brooklyn
City University of New York alumni
Bank Street College of Education alumni
Women New York City Council members
21st-century American politicians
21st-century American women politicians
African-American New York City Council members
1946 births
21st-century African-American women
21st-century African-American politicians
20th-century African-American people
20th-century African-American women